Tanisha Scott (born in Toronto, Ontario) is a three-time MTV VMA-nominated choreographer best known for her work with Rihanna, Alicia Keys, Sean Paul and Beyoncé. She is noted for incorporating Jamaican dancehall moves into mainstream music.

Early life 

Tanisha Scott was born in Toronto, Ontario. Her entry to dance was greatly influenced by her Jamaican roots. Her father owned a sound system and that inspired her love of music and movement. While she was enrolled at the University of Windsor on a track scholarship, she joined the local hip-hop dance troupe Do Dat.  Scott auditioned for a backup dancer slot on Mya's tour and was selected for the gig by Sho-Tyme, the singer's then-choreographer. Director Hype Williams booked Scott as a dancer for various videos early in her career, including a FUBU commercial featuring LL Cool J.
She earned her first choreography credit for the Little X-directed video "Gimme The Light" for Sean Paul and continues as the artist's choreographer and creative director for tours and videos.

Career 

In 2003, Vibe magazine's Rob Kenner wrote that Scott's choreography for Sean Paul's "Gimme The Light" video "introduced the latest Jamaican dances to the MTV crowd." The next year, she was nominated for an MTV Video Music Award in the Best Choreography category for Sean Paul's "Like Glue." She was nominated again in 2006 for Sean Paul's "Temperature" and in 2007 for rapper Eve's "Tambourine."

A 2008 Billboard magazine issue included Scott in its 30 Under 30 list; the article noted that Scott was chosen to choreograph Beyoncé's "Baby Boy" video based on her previous work with Sean Paul. Scott later worked with Beyoncé on her "Upgrade U" and "Check on It" videos. Her body of work, largely influenced by her Jamaican roots, attracted Rihanna's camp as they hired Scott for the Loud Tour, which featured heavy reggae basslines on songs such as "Rude Boy," "What's My Name?" and "Man Down." Scott went on to be the lead choreographer and movement coach behind the singer's "We Found Love" video. She worked with the singer during the Rated R, Loud and Talk That Talk albums and choreographed the "What's My Name," "Rude Boy" and "You Da One" videos in addition to choreographing Rihanna's tours.  Scott took part in Rihanna's Countdown to TTT, a behind-the-scenes documentary that lead up to the Talk That Talk LP's release in November 2011. She also demonstrated dance moves in the Making of We Found Love documentary."
Scott choreographed the videos for Whitney Houston's "I Look to You" and "Million Dollar Bill," Elephant Man's "Pon De River," Nas' "Bridging the Gap," and Amerie's "1 Thing." Scott also serves as the coach for the NBA's Brooklyn Nets Kids Dance Troupe. American Express profiled Scott in a 2015 commercial series. She danced with and choreographed the rapper Drake in his much lauded—and much parodied—video for 2015's "Hotline Bling." Rihanna assigned Scott to her ANTI World Tour and she appears in the singer's "Work" video.

Television

Scott was a coach for So You Think You Can Dance Canada and a featured guest choreographer on MTV's America's Best Dance Crew. During the ABDC segment, she tutored the 787 Crew on popular Jamaican dances such as the "Dutty Wine" and the "Chaplin" for a Dancehall-inspired performance on the show dubbed the "Rihanna Challenge," which was set to the singer's music.

Film

In addition to music videos and live performances, Scott creates movement for commercials, theater performances, films and television shows. She assisted the moves seen in Bring It On: All or Nothing .....(2006) and played a close friend of Rutina Wesley in the dance-based How She Move (2007). As a movement coach for Notorious (2009), the story of the late rapper The Notorious B.I.G., Scott helped Jamal Woolard, the lead actor, embody the physical movements of the title character Christopher "The Notorious B.I.G." Wallace. She was also an assistant choreographer on the set of Bride Wars (2009). In 2015, Scott choreographed the hip-hop throwback dance scene in Tina Fey and Amy Poehler's comedy Sisters. She's also responsible for dance moves in Netflix'''s The Unbreakable Kimmy Schmidt and coaching George Clooney through his first ever on-screen dance scene in Money Monster.Theatre

In 2010, Scott co-choreographed Venice—a rap musical that parallels Shakespeare's Othello—with John Carrafa during her stint touring with Rihanna. Time magazine's Richard Zoglin called the dancing "fluid" in an article titled  "The Year's Best Musical."  The next year, she choreographed the Off-Off-Broadway play, This One Girl's Story''.

Later in her career, Scott also transitioned into movement coaching and performance direction. As a movement coach, Scott works with not only dancers and artists, but also actors, musicians, models and athletes – helping them to emote and execute specific movements for a desired intent. In her performance direction, Scott orchestrates the strategic movement and expression for an artist on stage.

Creative Direction 
As a creative director, Scott creates and constructs visuals and concepts for live shows and television. Scott choreographs, stages and organizes dancers, and coordinates with styling, lighting, production and set design teams to bring moments to life. Scott is best known for her work with Cardi B, who first brought her on as creative director in 2018. She also provides creative direction for singer, H.E.R.

Work [Dance]

Appearances as Featured Dancer

Work [Choreography + Movement/Performance Direction]

Music Videos

Commercials/Brand Partnerships

Film/Television

Television Performances

Stage Performances/Tours

Theatre

Work [Creative Direction]

Stage Performances/Tours

Television Performances

Awards & Nominations

Grammy Awards

MTV Video Music Awards

Billboard Music Awards

References

External links 

 Internet Movie Database 
 Bloc NYC 

Year of birth missing (living people)
Living people
Artists from Toronto
Black Canadian dancers
Black Canadian women
Canadian choreographers
Canadian female dancers
Canadian women choreographers